Get Girls Aloud's Style is the fifth DVD featuring Girls Aloud, was released on November 12, 2007.  It features commentary from Girls Aloud on all of their favourite and least favourite outfits from their careers, as well as fashion tips. The video contains the group's first sixteen music videos.

Content
Girls Aloud's commentary on previously released music videos and artworks
Cheryl's make-up secrets
Nadine talks shoes
Kimberley on internet shopping
Nicola's tips for perfect jeans
Sarah on accessories
Music videos (with optional commentary):
 "Sound of the Underground"
 "No Good Advice"
 "Life Got Cold"
 "Jump"
 "The Show"
 "Love Machine"
 "I'll Stand by You"
 "Wake Me Up"
 "Long Hot Summer"
 "Biology"
 "See the Day"
 "Whole Lotta History"
 "Something Kinda Ooooh"
 "I Think We're Alone Now"
 "Walk This Way" (with Sugababes)
 "Sexy! No No No..."

Chart

References

External links

Girls Aloud video albums